Karel De Smet (born 21 August 1980) is a Belgian footballer who plays as centre back for KFC Merelbeke.

References

External links 
 
 
Karel De Smet on Footballdatabase

1980 births
Living people
Association football defenders
Belgian footballers
K.S.C. Lokeren Oost-Vlaanderen players
K.V.K. Tienen-Hageland players
Royal Antwerp F.C. players
Daejeon Hana Citizen FC players
Belgian Pro League players
Challenger Pro League players
Footballers from Ghent
Belgian expatriate footballers
K League 1 players
Expatriate footballers in South Korea
K.R.C. Zuid-West-Vlaanderen players